Pokřikov is a municipality and village in Chrudim District in the Pardubice Region of the Czech Republic. It has about 300 inhabitants.

History
The first written mention of Pokřikov is from 1392.

References

External links

Villages in Chrudim District